The 1921 Dover by-election was held on 12 January 1921.  The by-election was held due to the succession to the peerage of the incumbent Coalition Unionist MP, Vere Ponsonby as Ninth Earl of Bessborough.  It was won by the Independent candidate Thomas Andrew Polson.

Polson's election was supported by Horatio Bottomley, but although claimed by Bottonmley as a member of the right-wing Independent Parliamentary Group, he joined the Anti-Waste League shortly after his election. Polson stood again at the general election in November 1922, but was defeated by the Unionist candidate John Jacob Astor, whom he had defeated at the by-election in 1921.

Result

References

1921 in England
History of Dover, Kent
1921 elections in the United Kingdom
By-elections to the Parliament of the United Kingdom in Kent constituencies
1920s in Kent